As Regret Becomes Guilt: The Demos of Arsis is a compilation album by Arsis which was officially released on December 28, 2007 in both physical and digital formats via Negative-Existence Records. This release contains the band’s pre-A Celebration of Guilt recordings from 2001 and 2002, which led to Arsis signing with Willowtip Records in 2003.

Track listing

Credits

Personnel
James Malone - vocals, lead & rhythm guitar
Mike Van Dyne - drums
Kathy Burke - rhythm guitar (tracks 6-8)
Scot Seguine - bass (tracks 6-8)

Production
Brett Portzer - mixing, mastering
Mark Riddick - artwork, layout

References

Arsis albums
2007 compilation albums